, sometimes alternately spelled Syowa Station, is a Japanese permanent research station on East Ongul Island in Queen Maud Land, Antarctica. Built in 1957, Showa Station is named for the era in the Japanese calendar during which it was established, the Shōwa period.

Overview

Showa Station serves as a research outpost for astronomy, meteorology, biology and earth sciences.  It comprises over 60 separate buildings, large and small, including a 3-storey administration building, living quarters, power plant, sewage treatment facility, environmental science building, observatory, data processing facility, satellite building, ionospheric station, incinerator, earth science building, and radiosonde station.  Also present are fuel tanks, water storage, solar panels, a heliport,  water retention dam, and radio transmitter.

PANSY Incoherent Scatter Radar 
Showa station is home to the  Program of the Antarctic Syowa Mesosphere–Stratosphere–Troposphere/Incoherent Scatter (PANSY) incoherent scatter radar, which took its first measurements in 2017.

Legacy

1957 Expedition
The station was founded by the inaugural Japanese Antarctic Research Expedition in 1957. This expedition was airlifted out after a storm which made deploying the second team impossible in February 1958. In January 1959, the third team returned to the station and found that, of 15 sled dogs that had been left by the previous team, two, Taro and Jiro, had survived.

Historic monument
A cairn and plaque at the station commemorate Shin Fukushima, a member of the 4th Japanese Antarctic Research Expedition, who died in October 1960 while carrying out his  duties. The cairn, which contains some of his ashes, was erected on 11 January 1961 by his colleagues. It has been designated a Historic Site or Monument (HSM 2) following a proposal by Japan to the Antarctic Treaty Consultative Meeting.

In popular culture
 Showa Station is the Antarctic destination of the protagonists of A Place Further than the Universe, a 2018 Japanese anime series.
 The monster Ghidorah is located on the base - called "Outpost 32" - in the 2019 film Godzilla: King of the Monsters
 Showa Station is depicted in the 1983 film Antarctica.

Climate
The climate is classified as an Ice cap climate (Köppen: EF), since there are no months where the average temperature exceeds .

See also

 List of Antarctic research stations
 List of Antarctic field camps
 List of airports in Antarctica
Asuka Station
Dome Fuji Station
Mizuho Station
Antarctica (1983 film)
A Place Further than the Universe

References

External links
 Official website National Institute of Polar Research
 Syowa Base Now!! (Japanese only)
 OpenStreetMap
 COMNAP Antarctic Facilities
 COMNAP Antarctic Facilities Map
Showa Research Station Amateur Radio Station 8J1RL

Outposts of Queen Maud Land
Japanese Antarctic Program
Buildings and structures completed in 1957
Prince Harald Coast
1957 establishments in Antarctica
Historic Sites and Monuments of Antarctica